Berberonic acid (pyridine-2,4,5-tricarboxylic acid) is an organic compound that belongs to the heterocycles (more precisely the heteroaromatics). It belongs to the group of pyridinetricarboxylic acids and consists of a pyridine ring which carries three carboxy groups in the 2-, 4- and 5-positions. The name is derived from berberine.

Preparation 
Berberonic acid is obtained in the oxidation of berberine with nitric acid. It can also be derived by oxidative degradation of monascaminone with potassium permanganate.

References

Pyridines
Tricarboxylic acids
Aromatic acids